The Polestar 3 is an upcoming high-performance battery electric mid-size luxury crossover SUV to be produced by Swedish automobile manufacturer Volvo Cars and sold under the Polestar brand.

Overview
The Polestar 3 was officially revealed on 12 October 2022 and will be based on the upcoming Volvo EX90 flagship SUV, both of which are based on the 2021 Volvo Recharge concept.

Specifications

References

3
Mid-size sport utility vehicles
Crossover sport utility vehicles
Luxury crossover sport utility vehicles
Cars introduced in 2022
Rear-wheel-drive vehicles
All-wheel-drive vehicles
Production electric cars
Flagship vehicles